William Frederick John Kaye was an eminent Anglican priest in the second half of the nineteenth century and the first decades of the twentieth.

The son of John Kaye, Bishop of Lincoln and educated at Eton and Balliol. He was ordained in 1846 and became the incumbent at Riseholme.  He was Archdeacon of Lincoln from 1863 until  his death on 9 June 1913.

Kaye married Mary, daughter of Bishop John Jackson.

Notes

1822 births
People educated at Eton College
Alumni of Balliol College, Oxford
Archdeacons of Lincoln
1913 deaths